Simeon Davison Fess (December 11, 1861December 23, 1936) was a Republican politician and educator from Ohio, United States. He served in the United States House of Representatives (1915 to 1923) and U.S. Senate (1923 to 1935).

Early life
Born on a farm near Harrod, Ohio, to Henry and Barbara (Herring) Fess, he was educated in country schools and graduated at Ohio Northern University (ONU) of Ada in 1889 and married Eva C. Thomas the following year.  After graduation, he taught history and law at the university as well was working in the university administration from 1889 to 1896.  Fess graduated from the law department at ONU in 1894 and served as dean of that department from 1896 to 1900.  He then served as vice president of the university from 1900 to 1902.  He left for Illinois to become a graduate student and lecturer at the University of Chicago from 1902 to 1907.  He then returned to Ohio and served as the president of Antioch College of Yellow Springs from 1907 to 1917.

Politics
In 1912, while still serving at Antioch College, Fess was a delegate to the state constitutional convention as well as being elected as a Republican to the U.S. House of Representatives, serving from March 4, 1913 – March 3, 1923 (6th district 1913–15, 7th district 1915–23).  He served as chairman of the Committee on Education during the Sixty-sixth and Sixty-seventh Congresses, and chairman of the Republican National Congressional Committee from 1918 to 1922.  In 1922, he did not seek re-election, but ran for the U.S. Senate and won, serving from March 4, 1923, to January 3, 1935.  He served as chairman of the Committee on the Library during Sixty-ninth through Seventy-second Congresses, and as Republican Whip from 1929 to 1933.  He also served as chairman of the Republican National Committee 1930–32. After his appointment, the Cincinnati Enquirer referred to Fess as a "party wheelhouse and stand patter of the most approved type," and added "It was Senator Fess's proven ability not only to defend, but to eulogize, the acts of Republican administrations, no matter how unpopular they may be, that led to his selection as national chairman." Fess campaigned for the reelection of President Herbert Hoover by claiming Hoover was "the country's greatest peacetime leader," a hard sell in the fall of 1932. That speech, a month before the presidential election, was delivered to just 150 listeners, a sign of the Republican Party's problems in mid-Depression.  He was an unsuccessful candidate for a third term as senator in 1934.

Retirement and death
Fess was a Methodist, an editor, an author and a member of the Freemasons and Knights of Pythias.  He died in Washington, D.C., at the age of 75 and is interred at Glen Forest Cemetery in Yellow Springs, Ohio.

References

External links

 
 Political Graveyard
 Congress Bioguide

1861 births
1936 deaths
Antioch College
Claude W. Pettit College of Law alumni
Ohio Constitutional Convention (1912)
Ohio Northern University alumni
People from Harrod, Ohio
People from Yellow Springs, Ohio
Presidents of Antioch College
Republican National Committee chairs
Republican Party United States senators from Ohio
Republican Party members of the United States House of Representatives from Ohio
20th-century American politicians